The Arc of the United States  is an organization serving people with intellectual and developmental disabilities.  The organization was founded in the 1950s by parents of people with developmental disabilities. Since then, the organization has established state chapters in 39 states, and 730 local chapters in states across the country.  The Arc of the United States is based in Washington, D.C.

Work
The organization advocates for disabled people and helps them with issues like finding jobs, and helping employers adapt to the needs of disabled people.

According to financial statements submitted to the IRS, the organization's 2019 income was $9.8 million. Its end of year assets were reported to be $13.4 million. Major sources of income are charitable donations; dues for membership in local and state chapters; and government grants, contracts, and fees.

The Arc has condemned the use of aversives to modify behavior in people with disabilities.

History 

The first organization of families was the Children's Benevolent League, incorporated in 1936 in the state of Washington.   The San Francisco chapter was founded in 1951.

The organization was called the National Association for Retarded Children from 1953 to 1973 and then was the National Association for Retarded Citizens from 1973 to 1981, the Association for Retarded Citizens of the United States from 1981 to 1992, and it assumed its present name in 1992, as part of expanding its function and reacting to the euphemism treadmill.

In the summer of 2008, the Arc strongly criticized the movie Tropic Thunder, in which Ben Stiller portrays an actor whose roles include "Simple Jack", a man with an intellectual disability. The Arc called the portrayal "offensive" and also objected to the use of the words "retard", "moron", and "imbecile" throughout the movie.  The Arc was among a group of disability organizations, including the Special Olympics and the National Down Syndrome Congress which called for a boycott of the film.  Spokespeople for Tropic Thunder, along with Ben Stiller, argued that critics like the Arc did not understand that the movie was intended to make fun of actors and the movie industry, not individuals with disabilities, describing the movie as "an R-rated comedy that satirizes Hollywood and its excesses and makes it point by featuring inappropriate and over-the-top characters in ridiculous situations."  However, the Arc continued to criticize the film as containing hate speech, promoting offensive stereotypes of people with intellectual disabilities, and being offensive to people with disabilities and their families. The Arc of the United States called for all of its chapters across the nation to picket and protest against the film, launched educational campaigns, and wrote open letters to Ben Stiller and the film's creators explaining their criticisms and calling for Stiller to meet with disability advocates to engage in "honest and open dialogue about the offense this film perpetrates."

In May 2021, the Massachusetts Independent State auditor released findings that accused the management and board of directors of the Berkshire County Arc of misappropriating $777,844 in state funds meant for developmentally disabled persons.

References

External links
The Arc of the United States

Disability organizations based in the United States
Disability law advocacy groups in the United States
501(c)(3) organizations
Charities based in Washington, D.C.
Organizations established in 1950
1950 establishments in the United States